Pentavika is a cove at the northern side of Storsteinhalvøya in Gustav V Land at Nordaustlandet, Svalbard. The cove is located west of Westmanbukta, at the western entrance of Franklinsundet.

References

Bays of Svalbard
Nordaustlandet